Stenoschizomus is a monotypic genus of hubbardiid short-tailed whipscorpions, first described by Manuel González-Sponga in 1997. Its single species, Stenoschizomus tejeriensis is distributed in Venezuela.

References 

Schizomida genera
Monotypic arachnid genera